Schwandorf is a town on the river Naab in the Upper Palatinate, Bavaria, Germany, which is the seat of the Schwandorf district.

Sights

 Catholic parish church of St. Jakob
 Kreuzberg Church: Catholic parish, monastic and pilgrimage church of Mary Help of Christians on the Kreuzberg

Politics
Schwandorf (electoral district)

Sports
The towns association football club, 1. FC Schwandorf, experienced its greatest success in the late 1950s and 1960 when it spent thirteen seasons in the third division Bayernliga.

Twin towns – sister cities

Schwandorf is twinned with:
 Libourne, France
 Sokolov, Czech Republic

References

Schwandorf (district)